International High School of New Orleans is an American high school located in New Orleans, Louisiana, United States, at 727 Carondelet Street.

School history
The school is a charter school, and opened in the fall of 2009.  The first graduation of students occurred in 2013.

School building history
The school's building was built in 1937 and was previously the L. E. Rabouin Memorial Trades School, later named the L. E. Rabouin Vocational High School and then L. E. Rabouin Career Magnet School. The Louisiana Recovery School District took over managing the building and former school after Hurricane Katrina in 2005.  The building, however, has always been owned by the Orleans Parish School Board.

Athletics
International High School athletics competes in the LHSAA.

References

External links
International High School of New Orleans website

Charter schools in New Orleans
Public high schools in New Orleans
Educational institutions established in 2009
2009 establishments in Louisiana